Karl Tomas Bergh Strømme (born 26 February 1976 in Bergen, Norway) is a Norwegian jazz trumpeter.

Biography 
Strømme got his musical education at Norwegian Academy of Music in Oslo and Rhythmic Music Conservatory in Copenhagen. He has studied under Arve Henriksen, Jon Eberson and Flemming Agerskov. He has been touring in Scandinavia and occasionally in the rest of Europe as a member of The European Youth Jazz Orchestra

He has led the Telenor Storband and teaches music at the Norwegian Academy of Music. Strømme has also composed music for NRK and played regular for theaters like Nationaltheateret, Nordic Black Theatre and Riksteatret. Strømme was raised in Fredrikstad and in Bygdøy, where he also runs his own recording studio DynaLyd.

In 2004 he was the recipient of a scholarships from The Léonie Sonning Music Prize.

Within the band Peloton he has released two albums, Selected Recordings (2007) and The Early Years (2011). Strømme has also collaborated with Jono El Grande, Sandvika Storband, Gunnhild Nyborg, La Mascara Snake and Birgitte Damberg.

Discography 
1999: Instant Critique (Arbin Prod), with Edvard Bredok
1999: Lining Up! (Sandvika Storband), with Sandvika Storband
2003: .....Goes Fishing (Osito Records), with La Mascara Snake
2003: Fevergreens (Rune Grammofon), with Jono El Grande
2007: Selected Recordings ( Records), with Peloton
2008: Så Lenge Det Er Natt (Norsk Rock), single with Rex Rudi
2009: Corrupted Mirror ( Records), Nickelsen, Strømme, Nylander
2011: The Early Years ( Records), with Peloton

References

External links 

20th-century Norwegian male singers
20th-century Norwegian singers
21st-century Norwegian male singers
21st-century Norwegian singers
20th-century Norwegian trumpeters
21st-century Norwegian trumpeters
Norwegian jazz singers
Norwegian jazz trumpeters
Male trumpeters
Norwegian Academy of Music alumni
Academic staff of the Norwegian Academy of Music
Musicians from Bergen
1976 births
Living people
Male jazz musicians